Pirates of the Pines is a 1928 American drama film serial directed by J.C. Cook. The film is considered to be lost.

Cast
 George O'Hara as John Markham
 Rita Roma
 Jack Mower
 Charles Middleton
 Sumner Getchell
 King Zany

See also
 List of film serials
 List of film serials by studio

References

External links

1928 films
American silent serial films
1928 drama films
American black-and-white films
Lost American films
Silent American drama films
1928 lost films
Lost drama films
1920s American films